Jitumoni Kalita (born 10 October 2000) is an Indian cricketer. He made his List A debut for Assam in the 2017–18 Vijay Hazare Trophy on 8 February 2018. He made his Twenty20 debut for Assam in the 2018–19 Syed Mushtaq Ali Trophy on 21 February 2019.

References

External links
 

2000 births
Living people
Indian cricketers
Place of birth missing (living people)
Assam cricketers